The Gitwangak Indian Band  (formerly Kitwanga) is a band government in the Skeena Country region of northwestern British Columbia, Canada.  They Gitwangak people are part of the larger Gitxsan group.  Their name means "People of the Land of Rabbits". They are members of the Gitxsan Treaty Society.

Chief and Councillors

Treaty Process

History

Demographics

Economic Development

Social, Educational and Cultural Programs and Facilities

References

Skeena Country
Gitxsan governments